Tephritis kovalevi is a species of tephritid or fruit flies in the genus Tephritis of the family Tephritidae.

Distribution
Kazakhstan.

References

Tephritinae
Insects described in 1990
Diptera of Asia